Drugs or medicines may be withdrawn from commercial markets because of risks to patients, but also because of commercial reasons (e.g. lack of demand and relatively high production costs). Where risks or harms is the reason for withdrawal, this will usually have been prompted by unexpected adverse effects that were not detected during Phase III clinical trials, i.e. they were only made apparent from postmarketing surveillance data collected from the wider community over longer periods of time.

This list is not limited to drugs that were ever approved by the FDA. Some of them (lumiracoxib, rimonabant, tolrestat, ximelagatran and ximelidine, for example) were approved to be marketed in Europe but had not yet been approved for marketing in the US, when side effects became clear and their developers pulled them from the market. Some drugs in this list (e.g. LSD) were never approved for marketing in the US or Europe.

Significant withdrawals

Withdrawn clinical trial drugs
 
RG7795, in 2021 discontinued development

See also
 Adverse drug reaction
 Adverse events
 European Medicines Agency
 Food and Drug Administration

References

External links
  CDER Report to the Nation: 2005 Has a list of US withdrawals through 2005.

Withdrawn
Withdrawn